In quantum field theory, the Wightman distributions can be analytically continued to analytic functions in Euclidean space with the domain restricted to the ordered set of points in Euclidean space with no coinciding points. These functions are called the Schwinger functions (named after Julian Schwinger) and they are real-analytic, symmetric under the permutation of arguments (antisymmetric for fermionic fields), Euclidean covariant and satisfy a property known as reflection positivity. Properties of Schwinger functions are known as Osterwalder–Schrader axioms (named after Konrad Osterwalder and Robert Schrader). Schwinger functions are also referred to as Euclidean correlation functions.

Osterwalder–Schrader axioms

Here we describe Osterwalder–Schrader (OS) axioms for a Euclidean quantum field theory of a Hermitian scalar field , . Note that a typical quantum field theory will contain infinitely many local operators, including also composite operators, and their correlators should also satisfy OS axioms similar to the ones described below. 

 (E0) Temperedness 
 (E1) Euclidean covariance 
 (E2) Positivity 
 (E3) Symmetry 
 (E4) Cluster property

Temperedness 

Temperedness axiom (E0) says that Schwinger functions are tempered distributions away from coincident points. This means that they can be integrated against Schwartz test functions which vanish with all their derivatives at configurations where two or more points coincide. It can be shown from this axiom and other OS axioms (but not the linear growth condition) that Schwinger functions are in fact real-analytic away from coincident points.

Euclidean covariance 
Euclidean covariance axiom (E1) says that Schwinger functions transform covariantly under rotations and translations, namely:

for an arbitrary rotation matrix  and an arbitrary translation vector . OS axioms can be formulated for Schwinger functions of fields transforming in arbitrary representations of the rotation group.

Symmetry 

Symmetry axiom (E3) says that Schwinger functions are invariant under permutations of points:

,

Schwinger functions of fermionic fields are instead antisymmetric; for them this equation would have a ± sign equal to the signature of the permutation.

Cluster property 

Cluster property (E4) says that Schwinger function  reduces to the product  if two groups of points are separated from each other by a large constant translation:

.

The limit is understood in the sense of distributions. There is also a technical assumption that the two groups of points lie on two sides of the  hyperplane, while the vector  is parallel to it:

Reflection positivity 

Positivity axioms (E2) asserts the following property called (Osterwalder–Schrader) reflection positivity. Pick any arbitrary coordinate τ and pick a test function fN with N points as its arguments. Assume fN has its support in the "time-ordered" subset of N points with 0 < τ1 < ... < τN. Choose one such fN for each positive N, with the f's being zero for all N larger than some integer M. Given a point , let  be the reflected point about the τ = 0 hyperplane. Then,

where * represents complex conjugation. 

Sometimes in theoretical physics literature reflection positivity is stated as the requirement that the Schwinger function of arbitrary even order should be non-negative if points are inserted symmetrically with respect to the   hyperplane:

.

This property indeed follows from the reflection positivity but it is weaker than full reflection positivity.

Intuitive understanding 
One way of (formally) constructing Schwinger functions which satisfy the above properties is through the Euclidean path integral. In particular, Euclidean path integrals (formally) satisfy reflection positivity.  Let F be any polynomial functional of the field φ which only depends upon the value of φ(x) for those points x whose τ coordinates are nonnegative. Then
 

Osterwalder–Schrader theorem
The Osterwalder–Schrader theorem states that Euclidean Schwinger functions which satisfy the above axioms (E0)-(E4) and an additional property (E0') called linear growth condition can be analytically continued to Lorentzian Wightman distributions which satisfy Wightman axioms and thus define a quantum field theory.

Linear growth condition 

This condition, called (E0') in, asserts that when the Schwinger function of order  is paired with an arbitrary Schwartz test function  which vanishes at coincident points, we have the following bound:

where  is an integer constant,  is the Schwartz-space seminorm of order , i.e.

and  a sequence of constants of factorial growth, i.e.  with some constants .

Linear growth condition is subtle as it has to be satisfied for all Schwinger functions simultaneously. It also has not been derived from the Wightman axioms, so that the system of OS axioms (E0)-(E4) plus the linear growth condition (E0') appears to be stronger than the Wightman axioms.

History 

At first, Osterwalder and Schrader  claimed a stronger theorem that the axioms (E0)-(E4) by themselves imply the Wightman axioms, however their proof contained an error which could not be corrected without adding extra assumptions. Two years later  they published a new theorem, with the linear growth condition added as an assumption, and a correct proof. The linear growth condition (E0') is crucially used to show that the limit exists and is a tempered distribution.

Ref.   also contains another theorem replacing (E0') by yet another assumption called . This other theorem is rarely used, since  is hard to check in practice. See e.g.  for a review of these facts.

Other axioms for Schwinger functions

Axioms by Glimm and Jaffe

An alternative approach to axiomatization of Euclidean correlators is described by Glimm and Jaffe in their book. In this approach one assumes that one is given a measure  on the space of distributions . One then considers a generating functional

which is assumed to satisfy properties OS0-OS4:
 (OS0) Analyticity. This asserts that

Intuitively, this means that the measure  decays faster than any exponential.

 (OS1) Regularity. See  for the precise condition.
 (OS2) Euclidean invariance. This says that the functional  is invariant under Euclidean transformations . 
 (OS3) Reflection positivity. Denote by  where  is a reflection operation defined above. This axioms says that the matrix  has to be positive semidefinite.
 (OS4) Ergodicity. The time translation semigroup acts ergodically on the measure space . See  for the precise condition.

Relation to Osterwalder–Schrader axioms 

Although the above axioms were named by Glimm and Jaffe (OS0)-(OS4) in honor of Osterwalder and Schrader, they are not equivalent to the Osterwalder–Schrader axioms.

Then one can appeal to the Osterwalder–Schrader theorem to show that Wightman functions are tempered distributions. Alternatively, and much easier, one can derive Wightman axioms directly from (OS0)-(OS4).

It's not easy to extract these Schwinger functions from the measure   and show that they satisfy OS axioms, as it should be the case.

To summarize, the axioms called (OS0)-(OS4) by Glimm and Jaffe are stronger than the OS axioms as far as the correlators of the field    are concerned, but weaker than then the full set of OS axioms since they don't say much about correlators of composite operators.

Nelson's axioms 
These axioms were proposed by Edward Nelson. See also their description in the book of Barry Simon. Like in the above axioms by Glimm and Jaffe, one assumes that the field  is a random distribution with a measure . This measure is sufficiently regular so that the field  has regularity of a Sobolev space of negative derivative order. The crucial feature of these axioms is to consider the field restricted to a surface. One of the axioms is Markov property, which formalizes the intuitive notion that the state of the field inside a closed surface depends only on the state of the field on the surface.

See also
Wick rotation
Axiomatic quantum field theory
Wightman axioms

References

Axiomatic quantum field theory